Pemaling Gewog (Dzongkha: པདྨ་གླིང་) is a gewog (village block) of Samtse District, Bhutan.

References

Gewogs of Bhutan
Samtse District